WTC Wharf (formerly the World Trade Centre and WTC Northbank) is a twelve-storey office complex on the north bank of the Yarra River in Melbourne, Australia.

History
On 19 December 1978, the Government of Victoria passed the Port of Melbourne (World Trade Centre) Act 1978, vesting the Port of Melbourne Authority with authority to construct, maintain and operate a World Trade Centre in the Port of Melbourne. The centre, an example of Brutalist architecture, was built in the early 1980s and opened in 1983.

On 30 June 1994, Melbourne's first casino, Crown Casino opened in the World Trade Centre. The location was a temporary measure while Crown's permanent home, the Crown Casino and Entertainment Complex was constructed across the Yarra river at Southbank  In 1997, the centre hosted a temporary exhibition of waxworks from the Madame Tussauds wax museum in London.

Current use
The building currently houses some offices of the headquarters of Victoria Police, and the Victoria Police Museum, a collection of exhibits and memorabilia from over 150 years of policing in Victoria. It also houses offices for companies, including Thales Australia. The WTC shopping centre is undergoing redevelopment, including the proposed installation of an environmentally friendly air-conditioning system using water from the Yarra River. Further redevelopment plans include construction of restaurants, cafes, a hotel, a wine store, a function centre, and a health and beauty centre.

References

External links
WTC Wharf website

Buildings and structures in Melbourne City Centre
World Trade Centers
Brutalist architecture in Australia
Port of Melbourne
Kohlberg Kravis Roberts companies
1983 establishments in Australia
Buildings and structures completed in 1983